Chalana de Silva (born 8 October 1993) is a Sri Lankan cricketer. He made his first-class debut for Chilaw Marians Cricket Club in the 2014–15 Premier Trophy on 30 January 2015.

See also
 List of Chilaw Marians Cricket Club players

References

External links
 

1993 births
Living people
Sri Lankan cricketers
Chilaw Marians Cricket Club cricketers
Galle Cricket Club cricketers
Galle District cricketers
Cricketers from Galle